Sandor Tot is a Serbian professional pool player.
During the 2006 WPA World Nine-ball Championship he survived the group stages, the round of 64 and the round of 32, but was eliminated in the round of 16 by Li He-wen.
This performance secured him a spot in the 2007 edition of the tournament.
Tot plays for Slovenian club Biljard Klub Gomes.

Titles
 2002 European Pool Championship 8-Ball
 2004 Euro Tour Dutch Open
 2004 Euro Tour Spanish Open

References

External links

Living people
Serbian pool players
Place of birth missing (living people)
1972 births